Typhlocoelidae is a family of trematodes belonging to the order Plagiorchiida.

Genera:
 Manterocoelum Kanev, Radev & Fried, 2002
 Neivaia Travassos, 1929
 Polycyclorchis Pence & Bush, 1973
 Tracheophilus Skrjabin, 1913
 Typhlocoelum Stossich, 1903

References

Plagiorchiida